Samoo Architects & Engineers (SAMOO), headquartered in Seoul, South Korea, is a multinational professional services firm which provides architectural design, engineering, interior design, urban design, sustainable design, construction management, and building information modeling services. Currently the firm has over 760 employees based in offices located in Seoul, South Korea, New York, NY, Abu Dhabi, UAE, Doha, Qatar, Shanghai, China, Hanoi, Vietnam, Austin, TX, U.S.A.

History
1976  Samoo Architectural Research Institute Founded 
1979  Converted to Korean Architecture Incorporation Company
1980  Acquired License for Overseas Construction Business
1985  Company Name Changed to Samoo Architects & Engineers, Inc.
1993  Registered at the Korean Ministry of Works for Professional Overall Architecture Supervision Company
1993  Registered as a Korean Engineering Activity Company
1995  Established Branch Office in New York, USA
1997  Established Samoo Research Group
1998  Registered as a Korean Generalized Professional Supervision Company
2003  Entered into Construction Management Business
2004  Established a Branch Office in Shanghai, China
2006  30th Anniversary of Foundation
2010  Established a Branch Office in Vietnam 
2010  Established a Branch Office in Austin, USA 
2012  Established a Branch Office in Qatar
2012  Opened a branch in Beijing
2016 Won all of the top 3 International design awards (Red Dot, IF Design Award, IDEA)
2016 40th Anniversary

Notable projects

References 

Construction and civil engineering companies of South Korea
International engineering consulting firms
Companies based in Seoul
Design companies established in 1976
Architecture firms of South Korea
South Korean brands
Construction and civil engineering companies established in 1976
South Korean companies established in 1976